Altina Schinasi (August 4, 1907 – August 19, 1999) was an American sculptor, filmmaker, entrepreneur, window dresser, designer and inventor. She was best known for designing the Harlequin eyeglass frame.

Early life
Altina Schinasi was the youngest child born to the Schinasi family. She was born at the Schinasi Mansion on Manhattan's Upper West Side on August 4, 1907. After being tutored at home, Altina attended Horace Mann and at the age of twelve left home to board at Dana Hall School in Wellesley, Massachusetts.

Altina's mother took Altina and her sister to Paris shortly after her graduation from Dana Hall. There, Altina studied painting with her cousin, René Bensussan. While spending more time with Bensussan, she developed a deeper appreciation for art, and as a result, Altina chose to attend art school rather than college when she returned to the states. In New York, Altina studied with Samuel Halpert at the Roerich Museum.

Her father, Morris Schinasi, was a Sephardic Jew born in Manisa, Turkey. Altina's mother, Laurette Schinasi née Ben Rubi, the granddaughter of Schinasi's business associate Joseph Ben Rubi, was a native of Salonica, then in the Ottoman Empire. Upon Morris Schinasi's death in 1928, his widow Laurette Schinasi traveled to Manisa, Turkey to establish Moris Sinasi Çocuk Hastahanesi, or Moris Sinasi Children's Hospital in the city of her late husband's birth. It remains in operation today.

Philosophy 
“I painted for the joy of it–because it’s what I love to do. For me, art is fun. I like to make things. I’ve always liked to make things. If I couldn’t draw it and paint it, then I’d make a pillow or I’d make a quilt or I’d make something. I always had to make something and I was always looking for ideas for projects. I wanted to use my art to enrich my life.”

Window dresser
Altina took a job with Peter Copeland designing windows for Fifth Avenue stores. It was in this job that she found herself working alongside Salvador Dalí, who had been commissioned to design two Bonwit Teller windows. Altina worked in the Copeland workshop to build the windows that Dalí designed.

George Grosz, a German artist that Altina had long admired, settled in New York after fleeing Hitler's regime in 1932. Though he taught intermittently on the faculty of the Art Students League, Altina, now in her twenties and a divorced mother of two, studied with Grosz at the school that Grosz set up with painter Maurice Sterne. In Grosz’ classes, Altina again encountered Salvador Dalí who came to make use of the model.

Harlequin glasses frame
Though she would continue to register patents for inventions until late in life, Schinasi's  breakthrough came early on when she created and marketed the Harlequin eyeglass frame that defined glamour in the late 1930s. A walk down the street occasioned this design breakthrough; finding herself underwhelmed by the lackluster frames in an optician's window, Altina set out to create a frame that conveyed whimsy, mystery and romance.

“Surely, there must be some way to design eyeglasses that could be attractive! What looks good on a face? What adds to a face? What could a woman wear on her face that would be romantic?” she wondered. Altina settled on the Harlequin mask as a starting point and began to cut masks into the frames she envisioned.
Once she had set up production and negotiated deals with department stores, Schinasi opened an office where she oversaw marketing and distribution, later expanding her operation to the West Coast upon relocating to California. In 1939, Schinasi won the Lord & Taylor Annual American Design Award for her avant-garde transformation of the eyeglass frame into a proper fashion accessory. Vogue and Life magazines credited Schinasi with revolutionizing the eyewear industry and aesthetic. It was in California that her next creative phase would begin.

California years
In the 1940s, with hopes of spending more time on her art, Schinasi moved west to Los Angeles first expanding and finally selling her eyeglass concern. The move away from her business and New York allowed for a new level of commitment to her art. Having begun studies with Howard Warshaw at the Jepson School of Art in Los Angeles. Schinasi said, “I took a room in the house as my studio and put a sign on the door: ‘Do not come in unless there’s a catastrophe. I wanted to have three hours a day just to myself without interruption, and I really did work very hard.’” Schinasi began to paint in earnest and her large paintings were selected for the Los Angeles County Museum of Art (LACMA) juried show. In Los Angeles, Schinasi spent many years as a volunteer art therapist and muralist at experimental mental health center, Synanon.

George Grosz' Interregnum (1960)
It was in California that Schinasi conceptualized and produced George Grosz' Interregnum, a short documentary film that features the anti-Nazi work of the celebrated artist and Schinasi’s former teacher. With Grosz’ permission, given in a contract which Grosz wrote by hand on a napkin, Schinasi created a film of his drawings shot on sixteen-millimeter film. Grosz’ book, A Big No and a Little Yes was the source of the narrated text read by Lotte Lenya. George Grosz' Interregnum was nominated for an Academy Award and won First Prize at the Venice Film Festival. Schinasi is credited as producer under the name Altina Carey, her married name at that time. The film was preserved by the Academy Film Archive in 2013.

March on Washington
Following on the success of George Grosz' Interregnum, Schinasi found herself drawn to Martin Luther King Jr.’s March on Washington, to which to she acquired film rights. Schinasi engaged author John Oliver Killens to write the screenplay. When Killens had completed the script, Schinasi met with Dr. King in Atlanta to deliver the script. At Dr. King’s invitation, she visited Savior Church in Montgomery, Alabama where Dr. Martin Luther King, Sr. was the pastor and Dr. King Jr. was the guest preacher that Sunday. From the pulpit, Dr. King Jr. told the congregation about the script and how he looked forward to the movie. While in Alabama, Schinasi met Rosa Parks and taped an interview with Rev. Ralph Abernathy. Vittorio De Sica, the Italian director of the Bicycle Thieves, expressed interest in directing the film. However, Schinasi found it impossible to secure funding for the film, even from politically sympathetic potential investors, and the film was never made.

Characters
While looking at Cartier-Bresson’s photograph of unoccupied chairs, Schinasi was inspired to combine the function of the seat with the form of the sitter. She called these fantastic chairs and benches "chairacters". Schinasi first worked the core in Styrofoam and then sculpted the form in plaster. The fiberglass casts that were the final product were made of the sculpted prototype at a studio and factory in California. Her  were featured on the cover of The Los Angeles Times Magazine.

In 1973, Schinasi relocated to Washington D.C. where she would live for seventeen years. In 1978, she was interviewed by Pam Peabody at WPFW-Washington, D.C. about her 1978 exhibit at the Touchstone Gallery, as well as her life, work, and experience at Synanon. When Schinasi traveled to Santa Fe for the summer, Miranda accompanied her there. A gifted artist in his own right, Celestino would prove a great collaborator and an inspiration. They returned to Washington at the summer's end. The pair married in 1981.

Later years
Schinasi continued to paint and sculpt, establishing herself in Santa Fe, New Mexico where with her fourth husband, painter Celestino Miranda, she lived the final years of her life.  A documentary about her life, entitled Altina, was released in 2014.

References

Sources
Schinasi Miranda, Altina. The Road I Have Traveled. Santa Fe: Apodaca Hill Press, 1995

External links

Visions: sculptor Altina interviewed by Pam Peabody. Interview with Altina Schinasi and Joan Mister broadcast on WPFW, November 4, 1978.

1907 births
1999 deaths
20th-century American women artists
American filmmakers
American people of Ottoman-Jewish descent
Jewish American artists
Artists from New York City
20th-century American inventors
Women inventors
20th-century American Jews